Tamara Clark (born 9 January 1999) is an American track and field athlete who competes as a sprinter.

Representing the University of Alabama, Clark received five All-American awards and swept the 100 and 200 meters at the 2021 SEC Championships before making her Diamond League debut in 2021 in the 200 metres in Monaco. Clark finished in second place at the 2022 USATF Championships in the 200 metres to qualify for the 2022 World Athletics Championships, and cried with relief after missing out on a spot on the US Olympic team the year previous by one place. Clark was also named in the pool for the 4 x 100-meter relay for the event in Eugene, Oregon. Clark won her heat in a time 22.27, edging former world champion Dina Asher-Smith into second, to qualify for the semi-finals, before then reaching the final and finishing sixth overall on her major event debut.

References

1999 births
Living people
World Athletics Championships athletes for the United States
American female sprinters
20th-century American women
21st-century American women